The AccoLade is the first all-female alternative rock band from Saudi Arabia. The band consists of four college students of King Abdulaziz University. The band's name comes from Edmund Leighton's painting The Accolade of a princess knighting a warrior.

The band's first single, Pinocchio, has become an underground hit with quarter of a million downloads from the group's page on MySpace.

Controversy

American pop culture magazine, Venus Zine, featured The AccoLade in its “25 under 25” list for 2009 for bringing “progressiveness and greater promise” to Saudi Arabia.

References 

All-female bands
Saudi Arabian rock music groups
Saudi Arabian women artists